Wordie may refer to:

James Wordie (1889–1962), Scottish explorer and geologist
Wordie Glacier, a glacier in northeastern Greenland
Mount Wordie, a mountain in Alaska
Wordie House, the main hut of the former British Faraday Station in Antarctica, now the Vernadsky Research Base
Wordie Nunatak, a rock outcrop in Enderby Land, Antarctica
Wordie Bay, a bay in Antarctica near the Wordie Ice Shelf
Wordie Bay (Greenland), a bay in Greenland
Wordie Seamount, a seamount in the South Shetland Islands, Antarctica
Point Wordie, a headland on Elephant Island in the South Shetland Islands, Antarctica
Wordie Point, the southwestern point of Visokoi Island
Wordie Ice Shelf, a former glacier in Antarctica